The 2015 Nigerian Senate election in Niger State was held on March 28, 2015, to elect members of the Nigerian Senate to represent Niger State. Mustapha Sani representing Niger South, Aliyu Sabi Abdullahi representing Niger North and David Umaru representing Niger East all won on the platform of All Progressives Congress.

Overview

Summary

Results

Niger South 
All Progressives Congress candidate Mustapha Sani won the election, defeating People's Democratic Party candidate Zainab Abdulkadir Kure and other party candidates.

Niger North 
All Progressives Congress candidate Aliyu Sabi Abdullahi won the election, defeating People's Democratic Party candidate Aliyu Mohammed and other party candidates.

Niger East 
All Progressives Congress candidate David Umaru won the election, defeating People's Democratic Party candidate Mu'azu Babangida Aliyu and other party candidates.

References 

Niger State Senate elections
March 2015 events in Nigeria
Nig